Court of Session Act is a stock short title used in the United Kingdom for legislation relating to the Court of Session.

List
19 Geo 2 c 7 is sometimes referred to as the Court of Session (Scotland) Act 1745

The Court of Session Acts 1808 to 1895 is the collective title of the following Acts:
The Court of Session Act 1808 (48 Geo 3 c 151)
The Court of Session Act 1810 (50 Geo 3 c 112)
The Court of Session Act 1813 (53 Geo 3 c 64)
The Court of Session Act 1819 (59 Geo 3 c 45)
The Court of Session Act 1821 (1 & 2 Geo 4 c 38)
The Court of Session Act 1825 (6 Geo 4 c 120)
The Court of Session Act 1830 (11 Geo 4 & 1 Will 4 c 69)
The Court of Session (No. 1) Act 1838 (1 & 2 Vict c 86)
The Court of Session (No. 2) Act 1838 (1 & 2 Vict c 118)
The Court of Session Act 1839 (2 & 3 Vict c 36)
The Court of Session Act 1850 (13 & 14 Vict c 36)
The Bill Chamber Procedure Act 1857 (20 & 21 Vict c 18)
The Court of Session Act 1857 (20 & 21 Vict c 56)
The Court of Session Act 1868 (31 & 32 Vict c 100)
The Court of Session (Consignations) Scotland Act 1895 (58 & 59 Vict c 19)

See also
List of short titles

References

Lists of legislation by short title and collective title